Windows Maps is a web mapping client software from Microsoft. It is included with Windows 11 and Windows 10 operating systems and is also available for the Xbox Series X/S and Xbox One platforms.

Features
Its features include viewing classic style maps with roads and street names, getting directions, traffic conditions, GPS location, and viewing Streetside panoramas of roads. Users can synchronise favourites and directions with a Microsoft account. Maps of countries can be downloaded to the user's computer so that they can be used offline.

History
The original Maps app was based on existing Microsoft technologies such as Microsoft MapPoint and TerraServer that were already used in Bing Maps. It was first implemented on Windows Phone 7 as a Metro-style app using Bing Maps as its backend. In 2012 Maps came included with Windows 8 as one of the many Bing Apps. The app was updated with new features in Windows Phone 8.1 where the Maps app took on a Purple paper map-looking logo. Bing Maps at the time was powered by Nokia's data, which later became HERE Maps.

Windows Maps on Windows 10 Mobile then changed the layout of the Maps app, including the logo. Since coming out of preview, there has been three different layout changes, including the introduction of tabs, the ability for users to sketch using ink, a switch for choosing between a light and dark interface for the app shell, and a switch for choosing between a light and dark map.

After HERE Maps announced it was discontinuing its Windows 10 Mobile app in 2016, Windows Maps announced support for migrating up to 300 favorites from HERE Maps to Windows Maps.

In 2016, Windows Maps was released for Xbox One.

Since 2020, the base map data in Windows Maps and Bing Maps has been provided by TomTom, having replaced Here Technologies.

Coverage

Americas

Africa

Europe

Asia and Oceania

Middle East

See also
Bing Maps
Microsoft Streets & Trips
Microsoft MapPoint

References

Windows components
Universal Windows Platform apps
Microsoft Bing
Windows software
Xbox One software
Xbox Series X and Series S software